Dhammasattha ("treatise on the law") is the Pali name of a genre of literature found in the Indianized kingdoms of Western mainland Southeast Asia (modern Laos, Burma, Cambodia, Thailand, and Yunnan) principally written in Pali, Burmese, Mon or the Tai languages or in a bilingual nissaya or literal Pali translation. "Sattha" is the Pali cognate of the Sanskrit term for instruction, learning, or treatise, śāstra. Burmese  is often transliterated "dhammathat" and the Tai and Mon terms are typically romanized as "thammasāt" or "dhammasāt" Dhammasattha texts are historically related to Hindu dharmaśāstra literature, although they are very significantly influenced by the Theravada Buddhist traditions and literature of Southeast Asia.

History
The word dhammathat is first mentioned in a Burmese inscription from 13th-century Bagan, although it is likely that dhammasattha texts were transmitted there earlier. Certain dhammasatthas claim to have been compiled during the first millennium. There are nine primary Burmese dhammathats, namely the Manu and Dhammavisala Dhammathats of the Pagan Kingdom, the Wareru Dhammathat (1270), Pasedha (1468), Dhammathat Kyaw (1581), and Pyanchi Dhammathats (1614)  of the Taungoo Dynasty, and the Myingun Dhammathat (1650) of the Konbaung Dynasty. The first dhammathat mentioned in Burmese chronicles is the Duttabaung Dhammathat, during the time of Sri Ksetra Kingdom.

In traditional Burmese law, the order of precedence was mutual arbitration, yazathats, and dhammathat. Burmese dhammathats were supplemented by interpretive guidance in the form of ameindaw (edicts) or pyandan.

There is an extensive tradition of dhammasattha exegesis, particularly in Myanmar. Hundreds of dhammasatth, commentaries, and related legal texts are extant in parabaik (palm-leaf manuscript) form.

Legal history
Dhammasatths influenced a number of Southeast Asian societies prior to the colonial era in matters concerning marriage, theft, assault, slavery, debt, kingship, property, inheritance as well as other issues. In contemporary Burma, although colonial and post-colonial laws predominate, it remains acceptable practice to use dhammathat in law courts in certain areas of family and inheritance law.

See also 
 Burmese literature
 Thammasat University of Thailand

References

Andrew Huxley. "How Buddhist is Theravāda Buddhist Law?" The Buddhist Forum, Volume 1: Seminar Papers 1987-1988. New Delhi: Heritage Publishers, 1990.
Mya Sein. Mranʻ mā dha leʹ thuṃʺ tamʻʺ upade. Mandalay, 1970.
Than Tun. Khetʻ hoṅʻʺ rājavaṅʻ. Rangoon, 1961.
Lammerts, Dietrich Christian. 2010. Buddhism and written law dhammasattha manuscripts and texts in premodern Burma. Thesis (Ph.D.)--Cornell University, May 2010.
Lingat, Robert. Les régimes matrimoniaux du sud-est de l’Asie; essai de droit comparé indochinois. 2 vols. Paris, 1952–55.

Religious law
Legal history
History of Buddhism in Myanmar
Legal literature
Burmese Buddhist literature
Buddhist law